Ayesha Ferdaus is a Bangladesh Awami League politician and Member of Parliament from Noakhali-6.

Biography
Ayesha Ferdaus completed her education up to the undergraduate level. A business woman, she competed as an Independent candidate in the 2009 Bangladesh General Election. She lost to Mohammad Fazlul Azim, another independent candidate. She challenged his victory in the Bangladesh High Court in 2011. She was nominated from Noakhali-6 constituency which falls into the Hatiya Upazila of Noakhali District in 2014 Bangladesh General Election as a candidate of Bangladesh Awami League. She was nominated after her husband, Mohammad Ali, was declared by the Bangladesh Election Commission returning officer as being unfit for office and as a result could not be nominated.

In 2017, Ayesha Ferdaus was helping the government of Bangladesh relocate the Rohingya Refugees in Bangladesh to Bhasan Char, Noakhali District. According to her, the government will build the required facilities and services to house the Rohingyas in the Island. She is a member of The Parliamentary Standing Committee on the Ministry of Social Welfare.

Personal life
Her husband, Mohammad Ali, is a former Member of Parliament. A case was filed against her husband after Jubo League leader Riaz Uddin was killed during the Awami League fractional classes on 30 August 2017.

References

Awami League politicians
Living people
10th Jatiya Sangsad members
11th Jatiya Sangsad members
Women members of the Jatiya Sangsad
1961 births
21st-century Bangladeshi women politicians